Lega Sud Ausonia (Southern League Ausonia) is a minor independentist political party in Italy.

The party was founded in 1996, as the sister-party of Lega Nord in Southern Italy, and is led by Gianfranco Vestuto. Similarly to Lega Nord's goal of establishing an independent Padania, Lega Sud wants to establish an independent Ausonia, intended as Southern Italy. The party is not represented in the Italian Parliament, the European Parliament, nor in any regional or provincial assemblies.

In the 2001 general election Vestuto was a candidate of Lega Nord in Campania, but after that the two parties distanced themselves and Lega Sud chose to follow an anti-Northern line. In 2010 the party signed a federation pact with the newly formed We the South party. Under this agreement the group of NS in the Chamber of Deputies took the name of Noi Sud/Lega Sud Ausonia.

In the 2015 Campania regional election Lega Sud Ausonia supported the centre-right candidate Stefano Caldoro.

Leadership 

Federal Secretary: Gianfranco Vestuto
Honorary President: Yasmin von Hohenstaufen
Official Press Relationship: Francesco Montanino

References

External links
Official website

1996 establishments in Italy
Political parties established in 1991
Regionalist parties in Italy
Separatism in Italy